Dato' Cheah Kah Peng is a Malaysian politician, lawyer, painter, writer, filmmaker and human rights activist. He was the Penang State Legislative Assemblyman in Malaysia for the constituency of Kebun Bunga for one term from 2013 to 2018 representing the People's Justice Party (PKR), a component party of Pakatan Harapan (PH).

Background
Cheah Kah Peng was born in Georgetown, Penang. Cheah is his family name, and Kah Peng is his given name. He attended Soochow University and University of Oxford where he studied law. He received the prestigious British Government Chevening Scholarship and read law in Oxford.

Living as a young traveller in Europe, Asia and Australia during the 1980s and 1990s he became involved in many civil and human rights campaign activities. He travelled widely as a painter, writer, filmmaker and human rights activist before he returned to Malaysia from Australia during the mid 90s, and practices laws at Cheah Kah Peng & Co., Penang.

Politics
Cheah became one of the earliest founding members of a new National Justice Party (KeADILan) on 4 April 1999 (which subsequently amalgamated with Malaysian People's Party (PRM) to become People's Justice Party (PKR).

The political party he helped to construct focused on dismantling its colonial legacy of racial divide (or apartheid) through tackling institutionalised racism, poverty and inequality. He was elected as member of the party's Supreme Council and served as central committee member from 1999 to 2010. He was reported to be one of the International Human Rights lawyers at risk in international journals from 1999 to 2003 during which he was one of the few lawyers who stood up against Malaysia's draconian Internal Security Act (ISA). In the year 2000, he was arrested and imprisoned in Malaysia for a trumped up charge of obstructing police officers in execution of their duty while the truth was that he tried to stop the police from causing grievous bodily harm to political detainees.

In the 2013 general election, he was picked by PKR to contest and won the Penang state seat of Kebun Bunga to be its assemblyman.

Controversies
In November 2015, Cheah with four other PKR Penang assemblypersons – Ong Chin Wen (Bukit Tengah), Dr Norlela Ariffin (Penanti), Dr T. Jayabalan (Batu Uban) and Lee Khai Loon (Machang Bubok) abstained from voting against a land reclamation motion proposed by the opposition United Malays National Organisation (UMNO); causing a conflict of the Pakatan Harapan (PH) state government and a strained relation with the Chief Minister of Penang then, Lim Guan Eng. In February 2016, Lim announced that Cheah and Ong who was also the state PKR whip had been removed from their positions in the state government-linked companies (GLCs). Cheah was sacked as the director of the Penang Hill Corporation (PHC) while Ong was sacked as the director posts in Penang Invest and Island Golf Properties Bhd, a subsidiary company of Penang Development Corporation.

In 2017, Cheah was excluded from the PH assemblypersons list, who were to register victims of the Penang's devastating floods on 4–5 November in their own constituency for the state's initiated post-flood relief aid of RM700 for every eligible recipient. The Chief Minister Lim announced he together with the Pulau Tikus assemblyperson Yap Soo Huey instead would register floods victims in Cheah's Kebun Bunga constituency, near Botanical Gardens. To counter back, a defiant Cheah held a similar programme not far away from the one organised by the state government.

As speculated, Cheah was dropped by PKR as the PH candidate, to make way of the Kebun Bunga seat for the predecessor assemblyman, Jason Ong Khan Lee returning to contest the 2018 general election. Ong managed to win the election on 9 May 2018 to be the Kebun Bunga assemblyman again.

Election results

Honours 
  :
  Officer of the Order of the Defender of State (DSPN) – Dato’ (2022)

External links

References 

Living people
Year of birth missing (living people)
People from Penang
Malaysian people of Chinese descent
20th-century Malaysian lawyers
Malaysian painters
Malaysian writers
Malaysian filmmakers
Malaysian human rights activists
People's Justice Party (Malaysia) politicians
Members of the Penang State Legislative Assembly
Soochow University (Taiwan) alumni
Alumni of the University of Oxford
21st-century Malaysian politicians
21st-century Malaysian lawyers